"Disco" is the 2019 lead single on the album Heaven Surrounds You by the band Surf Curse for the label Danger Collective. It was released on 12 June alongside a music video directed by band member Nick Rattigan The song, in part inspired by the film The Last Days of Disco, was praised for its use of guitar and percussion.

Content and reception
The song was released on 12 June 2019 ahead of Heaven Surrounds You, Surf Curse's first album after band members Nick Rattigan and Jacob Rubeck relocated from Reno, Nevada, to Los Angeles.

Released after "two years of silence from the band", Adrian Vargas of Atwood Magazine called the song "the strongest contenders for 2019’s best dance anthem." Quinlan Keeley, writing for Stereogum, compared the song favorably to "A-Punk" and other early Vampire Weekend songs, saying the track has a "sparky guitar voice." Abby Jones of Pitchfork also positively compared the track to Vampire Weekend's debut, calling it the best song of the album.

The song was chosen to close some of the band's concerts during their 2022 tour, during which the song was particularly well-received during their tour opener in Las Vegas and at their November show in Houston.

Music video
The music video, also released 12 June 2019, was directed by Rattigan. The video depicts "evening of raw emotion" between a couple in an apartment, dancing to the song in a "warmly-lit" apartment that, part way through the video, turns blue, hazy, and covered in tinsel like a "dimly lit dance hall". Vargas described the video as showing the couple as "stillness surrounds them", leaving viewers "breathless". Rubeck said the dancing was inspired by Hal Hartley dance videos.

References

2019 singles
American garage rock songs
Surf rock songs